Worsbrough Bridge Athletic Football Club is a football club based in Worsbrough, Barnsley, South Yorkshire, England.

History
The club was formed as Worsbrough Bridge St James in 1923, before being renamed Worsbrough Bridge Athletic. After playing in the Barnsley Junior League, the club joined the Barnsley Nelson League in 1939. They were runners-up in the league in 1943–44 and champions the following season. They returned to the Junior League in 1947, before switching to the Barnsley Association League in 1949. They were league champions in 1950–51 and 1952–53 and League Cup winners in 1956–57 and 1958–59. The club were renamed Worsbrough Bridge Miners Welfare & Athletic in 1961 after entering into partnership with the local Miners Welfare scheme, after which they joined Division Two of the Sheffield Association League in 1963.

Worsborough Bridge were promoted to Division One at the end of their first season in the Sheffield Association League, and were Division One champions in 1965–66 and 1969–70. In 1971 the club moved up to Division Three of the Yorkshire League. After finishing third in their first season in the league, they were promoted to Division Three. Another third-placed finish in 1972–73 saw them earn a second successive promotion to Division One. They finished second-from-bottom of Division One in 1975–76 and were relegated to Division Two. After finishing third-from-bottom of Division Two in 1978–79 the club were relegated to Division Three.

When the Yorkshire League merged with the Midland League to form the Northern Counties East League in 1982, Worsbrough were placed in Division Two South. League reorganisation in 1984 saw them moved to Division One Central, before further reorganisation saw them placed in Division Three for the 1985–86 season. They went on to finish as runners-up in the division, earning promotion to Division Two. The club were Division Two runners-up in 1990–91 and were promoted to Division One. They were Division One runners-up in 1990–91.

In 2006 the club were renamed Worsbrough Bridge Athletic. They finished bottom of Division One in 2009–10 and 2015–16 but were not relegated.

Season-by-season record

Ground
The club began playing at Park Road before World War II, but left in 1947. They returned after purchasing the ground in 1953. After entering into partnership with the Miners Welfare scheme, the ground was developed with new changing rooms and a new hall during the early 1960s. In the early 1970s a new stand was built. A record attendance of 1,603 was set for  an FA Amateur Cup match against Blyth Spartans in 1971, although the real figure may have been closer to 2,500. Floodlights were installed in 1993.

Honours
Sheffield Association League
Division One champions 1965–66, 1969–70
League Cup winners 1965–66
Barnsley Association League
Champions 1950–51, 1952–53
League Cup winners 1956–57, 1958–59
Barnsley Nelson League
Champions 1944–45

Records
Best FA Cup performance: First qualifying round, 1978–79, 1979–80, 1980–81, 2002–03
Best FA Amateur Cup performance: Third qualifying round, 1971–72 1972–73
Best FA Vase performance: Third round, 1990–91
Record attendance: 1,603 vs Blyth Spartans, FA Amateur Cup, 1971

See also
Worsbrough Bridge Athletic F.C. players
Worsbrough Bridge Athletic F.C. managers

References

External links
Official website

 
Football clubs in England
Football clubs in South Yorkshire
Association football clubs established in 1923
1923 establishments in England
Sport in Barnsley
Mining association football teams in England
Sheffield & Hallamshire County FA members
Barnsley Association League
Sheffield Association League
Yorkshire Football League
Northern Counties East Football League